Xavier Hernández Creus (born 25 January 1980), commonly known as Xavi, is a Spanish professional football manager and former player who is the manager of La Liga club Barcelona. Widely considered one of the greatest midfielders of all time, Xavi was renowned for his passing, vision, ball retention, and positioning."Sergio Busquets: Xavi is Spain's best player of all time". Fox Sports. Retrieved 22 January 2016

Xavi joined La Masia, the Barcelona youth academy, at age 11, and made his first-team debut against Mallorca in August 1998, age 18. In all, he played 767 official matches, a former club record—now held by Lionel Messi—and scored 85 goals. Xavi is the first player in the club's history to play 150 European and FIFA Club World Cup matches combined. With Barcelona, Xavi won eight La Liga titles and four UEFA Champions League titles. Xavi came third in the 2009 FIFA World Player of the Year, followed by third place for its successor award, the FIFA Ballon d'Or, in 2010 and 2011. In 2011, he was runner up to Messi for the UEFA Best Player in Europe Award. In 2015, he departed Barcelona for Al Sadd, where he won four trophies before retiring in 2019.  He is one of the few recorded players to have made over 1,000 professional career appearances.

With Spain, Xavi won the FIFA World Youth Championship in 1999, and the Olympic silver medal at the 2000 Olympics. After making his senior team debut in 2000, he was capped 133 times for his country, and was an influential figure in the team's successes. He played an integral role in Spain's victory at the 2010 FIFA World Cup, as well as their wins at UEFA Euro 2008 and UEFA Euro 2012. He was named Player of the Tournament at UEFA Euro 2008, and was named in the UEFA Euro Team of the Tournament in 2008 and 2012. With two assists in the UEFA Euro 2012 Final, Xavi became the first player to register assists in two separate European finals, after setting up the only goal in the final four years earlier. After the 2014 FIFA World Cup, Xavi announced his retirement from international football.

Xavi was awarded the IFFHS World's Best Playmaker award four times, all straight between 2008 and 2011. He was included in the FIFA FIFPro World XI on six occasions: 2008 to 2013, and the UEFA Team of the Year five times: 2008 to 2012. In 2020 Xavi was named in the Ballon d'Or Dream Team, a greatest all-time XI published by France Football magazine. Xavi was awarded the Prince of Asturias Award in 2012, and he won 32 trophies in his career, making him the second-most decorated Spanish player in history, behind former teammate Andrés Iniesta. After retirement, Xavi transitioned to coaching, and he was named the manager at Qatar Stars League club Al Sadd in May 2019, where he won seven titles in less than three years. In November 2021, Xavi was appointed as manager at his former club Barcelona.

Early life

Born in Terrassa, Barcelona, Catalonia,<ref
name="barcelonasite"></ref> Xavi is a product of FC Barcelona's La Masia youth system, which he joined at the age of 11 from UFB Jàbac Terrassa and Terrassa FC. His father, Joaquim, was a former player for Sabadell in the first division. Xavi made his way through the youth and reserve teams and was a key member of Josep Maria Gonzalvo's Barcelona B team that won promotion to the Second Division.

Although he was initially inspired by compatriot playmaker Pep Guardiola at Barcelona, as a child Xavi also watched a lot of English football, and looked up to midfielders John Barnes, Paul Gascoigne and Matt Le Tissier.

Club career

Barcelona

1998–2001: Beginnings
Xavi's progression through the teams earned him a first-team appearance in a Copa Catalunya match against Lleida on 5 May 1998 and he scored his first goal on 18 August 1998 in the 1998 Supercopa de España against Mallorca. His debut in La Liga came against Valencia on 3 October 1998 in a 3–1 victory for Barcelona. Initially featuring intermittently both for the reserve and senior teams, Xavi scored the only goal in a 1–0 victory over Real Valladolid when Barcelona were in tenth position in the league. Sustained impressive performances meant that he became a key member of Louis van Gaal's title-winning team, finishing his debut season with 26 matches played and being named 1999 La Liga Breakthrough Player of the Year. Xavi became Barcelona's principal playmaker after an injury to Pep Guardiola in the 1999–2000 season.

2001–2008: Breakthrough and vice-captaincy

In these years, Barcelona was on the verge of bankruptcy and struggling to keep its place in La Liga's elite. Playing midfield, but in a more defensive role, Xavi made 20 assists and scored 7 goals in those two seasons. On 16 March 2002, he scored his first goal in El Clásico against Real Madrid.

Xavi was named the vice-captain in the 2004–05 season, in which he helped Barcelona win La Liga and the 2004 Supercopa de España. He was named La Liga Spanish Player of the Year in 2005.

In the 2005–06 season, Xavi tore the ligaments in his left knee in training; he was out of action for four months but returned in April and was on the substitutes bench for Barcelona's win in the 2006 Champions League Final against Arsenal. He also won La Liga and the Supercopa de España again.

2008–2012: Sustained domestic and European success

After being named Player of the Tournament at Euro 2008, Xavi spoke to Bayern Munich about a transfer, but newly appointed Barcelona coach Pep Guardiola convinced him that he was too important to the club to be allowed to leave. He was a main part of Barcelona's treble and scored the fourth goal in the 4–1 win in the 2009 Copa del Rey Final against Athletic Bilbao, with a free kick. In La Liga, one of his most significant games was the 6–2 Clásico victory over Real Madrid on 2 May; he assisted four goals – once to Carles Puyol, once to Thierry Henry and twice to Lionel Messi.

Xavi helped Barcelona win the 2009 Champions League Final 2–0 against Manchester United, assisting the second goal by crossing to Messi for his header. Prior to the match, Manchester United coach Sir Alex Ferguson heaped praise on the central midfield combination of Xavi and Andrés Iniesta, stating, "I don't think Xavi and Iniesta have ever given the ball away in their lives. They get you on that carousel and they can leave you dizzy." Xavi was voted "UEFA Champions League best midfielder" for his contribution during Barcelona's victorious 2008–09 Champions League campaign. Xavi was the highest assisting player in La Liga with 20, and in the Champions League, with 7; he earned 29 assists overall that season. Xavi was under contract to Barça until 2014 after extending his contract during the 2008–09 season. The new contract made him one of the club's biggest earners, with a salary of €7.5 million a year.

During the 2009–10 season, journalists increasingly noted Xavi's contribution to the Barcelona team. For example:

In the 2009–10 season, Xavi again topped the assists table and provided both the assists in Barcelona's 2–0 victory against Real Madrid at the Santiago Bernabéu. Barcelona won the Liga title with a record 99 points, and Xavi was acclaimed Barcelona's second-best player in a season-long vote. On 3 June 2010, Madrid-based newspaper Marca awarded him third place in the annual Trofeo Alfredo di Stéfano award for the best player in La Liga, behind Messi and Cristiano Ronaldo.

On 9 June 2010, Xavi signed a new four-year contract with the club, which could be automatically renewed up to 30 June 2016 based on number of games played. On 29 November, he scored his third goal against arch-rivals Real Madrid in a 5–0 home win. On 18 December, he scored another goal against Espanyol in a 5–1 win. In the Champions League, Xavi scored a valuable goal with an assist from David Villa in a home win against Arsenal, that saw Barcelona progress to the quarter-finals.

Xavi was one of the three finalists for the 2010 FIFA Ballon d'Or, and finished third in the vote behind his Barcelona teammates Lionel Messi and Andrés Iniesta. He narrowly defeated Messi to win the Player of the Year award from World Soccer magazine.

On 2 January 2011, in a league match against Levante, Xavi made his 549th appearance for the club in all competitions, matching the record held by Migueli. Xavi later became the player with the most appearances for Barcelona of all time. On 28 May, Xavi was imperious in the 2011 UEFA Champions League Final at Wembley Stadium in London as Barcelona defeated Manchester United in the showpiece for the second time in three seasons, winning 3–1.

Xavi began the 2011–12 season in fine goalscoring form and seemed to grow in his influence of the team despite the long-anticipated return of Cesc Fàbregas and the promotion of Thiago to create added competition for places in Barças attacking midfield positions. On 18 December, in the 2011 FIFA Club World Cup Final in Yokohama, Barcelona won 4–0 against Brazilian side Santos as Xavi scored a goal and made an assist to Lionel Messi. After the ball was slightly behind him, Xavi brought the ball down with a cocked leg, effectively using his ankle to control it, before slipping a pass through to Messi, who scored the first goal.

Xavi scored the winning goal in the Group H game against A.C. Milan, a vital match for Barcelona's progression in the Champions League knockout stage. In total, Xavi had the best goalscoring return of his career in 2011–12 season with ten Liga goals, two in the Copa del Rey – which Barcelona won – and one in the Club World Cup final win.

2012–2015: Later years and departure

On 18 December 2012, Barcelona renewed Xavi's contract, extending it until 30 June 2016.
He scored a goal against Real Madrid in a 3–2 win for Barcelona. Xavi was named in the FIFA World XI, along with teammates Iniesta, Messi and Dani Alves. Barcelona had virtually secured their La Liga title by the start of 2013, eventually equalling Real Madrid's 100-point record of the previous season.

On 16 January 2014, Xavi made his 700th appearance for the first team against Getafe in the Copa del Rey. For the first time in five years, Barcelona ended the season without a major trophy; they were defeated in the Copa del Rey Final by Real Madrid with Gareth Bale scoring a late winner, and lost the league in the last game to Atlético Madrid.

In June 2014, it was announced that Xavi would be leaving the club. On 22 July, however, after talks with newly appointed manager and former teammate Luis Enrique, Xavi decided to stay at Camp Nou for one more season. He was also appointed as club captain. On 25 April 2015, Xavi made his 500th La Liga appearance, becoming the eighth player in history to do so. On 4 June, a farewell event was held at Barcelona for Xavi with players, managers, friends and family paying tribute to him.

On 6 June 2015, Xavi came on as a 78th-minute substitute for Andrés Iniesta to make his 767th and final appearance for Barcelona during the 2015 Champions League Final, as the club won its fifth European Cup, beating Juventus at Berlin's Olympiastadion. Xavi, as club captain, lifted the trophy. This made Barcelona the first club in history to win the treble of domestic league, domestic cup and European Cup twice. Xavi, Iniesta, Messi, Gerard Piqué, Pedro, Sergio Busquets and Dani Alves were part of both treble-winning teams. Xavi's 767 appearances was a club record until surpassed by Lionel Messi in March 2021.

Al Sadd

On 21 May 2015, Xavi announced that he would join Qatari club Al Sadd at the end of the 2014–15 season on a three-year contract. According to his agent, the deal would involve him becoming an ambassador for the 2022 FIFA World Cup in Qatar, and also start his coaching qualifications. He made his debut for Al Sadd in a 4–0 win over Mesaimeer on 13 September 2015, assisting in the team's first goal. In the following match, he scored his first goal for the club in a 2–2 draw with Umm Salal. Al Sadd ended the league campaign in third position putting them in a place for the next season's AFC Champions League, the elite club competition of the Asian Football Confederation. Xavi scored three goals during the season. In the Champions League, Al Sadd were knocked out from the qualifying rounds by Emirati side Al Jazira on penalties; Xavi missed his spot kick.

Xavi won his first trophy with Al Sadd following a 2–1 victory over El Jaish in the Qatar Cup final on 29 April 2017. On 10 November 2017, Xavi said that he would retire when his contract with Al Sadd expired at the end of the 2017–18 season, and would later pursue a coaching career. However, he postponed these plans and signed a two-year contract extension on 24 May 2018. In October 2018, Al Sadd reached the 2018 AFC Champions League semi-finals of the tournament with Xavi as captain but were eliminated 2–1 by Persepolis.

On 2 May 2019, Xavi announced that he would be retiring from professional football at the end of the season. On 20 May 2019, Xavi played the final match of his career, a 2–0 defeat to Persepolis in Tehran, Iran which was Al Sadd's final AFC Champions League group match; before the match, he stated that he would like to remain in Qatar after his retirement, and that he would look to begin a coaching career, commenting: "The idea is to start as a coach in Qatar, to test myself and get some experience."

International career

Xavi played for Spain at the 2000 Olympics, 2002 World Cup, Euro 2004, 2006 World Cup, Euro 2008, 2009 Confederations Cup, 2010 World Cup, Euro 2012, 2013 Confederations Cup and the 2014 World Cup. In 1999 he was part of the Spanish team that won FIFA World Youth Championship in Nigeria, with Xavi also scoring two goals in the tournament.

UEFA Euro 2008
Xavi was named Euro 2008's player of the tournament after Spain defeated Germany 1–0 in the final. Xavi was dominant in midfield, where his passing and reading of the game was pivotal to Spain's success, as he led his nation to their first silverware since the 1964 European Championship. Andy Roxburgh, head of UEFA's Technical Committee, said, "We have chosen Xavi because he epitomizes the Spanish style of play. He was influential in the whole possession, passing and penetrating kind of game that Spain played."

Xavi scored the first goal in the semi-final against Russia, which Spain won 3–0. In the final, he made the pass from which Fernando Torres scored the winning goal.

2010 World Cup

Xavi was named in Spain's squad for the 2010 World Cup in South Africa, with Spain eventually winning their first World Cup. He provided the most accurate passes, 599 with a passing success rate of 91%, and he crossed the ball inside the 18-yard box more than any other player in the tournament. In the final he made 57 accurate forward half passes. Xavi also covered 80.20 kilometres throughout the competitions, averaging approximately 11.5 kilometres per game, more than any other player. In the final, he covered a distance of almost 15 kilometres.

During the round of 16 match against Portugal, Xavi provided a backheel pass in the 63rd minute to David Villa. Although Villa had his shot with his left foot blocked by goalkeeper Eduardo, he then put in the rebound with his right foot for the winning goal. In the semi-final against Germany, Xavi crossed from a corner to the edge of the six-yard box, where Carles Puyol scored with a header into the top-right corner. Spain dominated possession throughout the competition, averaging 59% possession during their three group matches, and 44 passes per shot throughout the entire World Cup, in large part thanks to midfield trio of Xavi, Iniesta, and Xabi Alonso, who were singled out in the media for their role in Spain's title–run; Spain also completed more passes (3,547) than any World Cup team since 1966.

UEFA Euro 2012

Xavi played for Spain at Euro 2012 which Spain won by defeating Italy 4–0 in the final. Xavi attempted 136 passes (127 completed, 94% success rate) during Spain's 4–0 victory in the group stage match against the Republic of Ireland, more than any other player in a European Championship match. The previous record of 117 had been set by Ronald Koeman in a Euro 1992 match between the Netherlands and Denmark. Xavi and Andrés Iniesta made 229 passes in the match, more than the combined Irish team managed. "Pum, pum, pum, pum" was how Xavi described the rhythmic sound of the ball moving between himself and his midfield partner.

With Xavi providing two assists in the final, for Jordi Alba and Fernando Torres, he became the first player to register assists in two European Championship finals. Spain's UEFA Euro 2012 victory made Xavi the most decorated player in Spanish football history, a status that he previously shared with Carles Puyol, who missed the tournament.

Retirement
On 5 August 2014, following the 2014 World Cup where Spain were eliminated at the group stage, Xavi announced his retirement from international football, having made 133 appearances in a 14-year period. Spain's World Cup-winning manager Vicente del Bosque paid tribute, stating that Xavi was "a key part of the team's style of play" and "he was more important to us than even the manager", also adding, "We will miss him both on and off the pitch. He is a player who we hold in great esteem both personally and as a player. He is and always will be a person and a player who is greatly valued by the federation, the coaching staff and by myself."

Managerial career
Al Sadd

On 28 May 2019 it was announced that Xavi would take over as manager of Al Sadd on a two-year contract. Xavi helped the club reach the semi-finals of the AFC Champions League, where they were eliminated by Al-Hilal FC 6–5 on aggregate. In the league, the club finished third. In the 2019–20 season, Xavi led his team to win one domestic trophy, the Qatar Cup. In the 2020 AFC Champions League, Al Sadd reached the round of 16 but were eliminated 1–0 by Persepolis. During his 97 games in charge of Al Sadd, spanning two and a half years, he led the club to seven trophies.

On 3 November 2021, Al Sadd drew 3–3 against Al-Duhail in his final game in-charge. Two days later Al Sadd announced Xavi's move to Barcelona after his release clause was paid.

Barcelona
On 6 November 2021, Xavi returned to his former club Barcelona as the new manager replacing Ronald Koeman, on a contract until June 2024. Following his arrival, Xavi reportedly implemented stricter rules for the players which included re-introduction of fines, early arrival for training and tracking of players' off pitch activities.

In his first game in charge, Barcelona defeated local rival Espanyol by a 1–0 scoreline at the Camp Nou in La Liga to win his first Catalan Derby as manager. On 4 December, Xavi suffered his first defeat as Barcelona manager after losing 1–0 to Real Betis at home in La Liga. In Xavi's first Champions League campaign, he took charge with two group stage matches remaining. After drawing 0–0 with Benfica at the Camp Nou on 23 November and losing 3–0 to Bayern Munich on 8 December at the Allianz Arena, Barcelona finished third in the group stage which put them in the Europa League knockout round play-offs.

On 12 January 2022, in his first Clásico in charge, Barcelona were beaten by Real Madrid 2–3 at the end of extra-time in the Supercopa de España semi-final. Barcelona suffered an early exit from the Copa del Rey after being beaten by Athletic Bilbao 3–2 at the end of extra-time in the round of 16. In the winter transfer window, Barcelona strengthened their attack with the signings of Ferran Torres and Pierre-Emerick Aubameyang and Adama Traoré on loan. After a difficult first few months for Xavi, Barcelona quickly turned around their form with the new signings playing a big role in the process. The team entered a 14-match unbeaten streak starting with a 0–1 victory over Alavés in La Liga, during this run they scored four goals in 6 out of 11 matches and also qualified for the quarter-finals of the Europa League. On 20 March, Xavi won his first Clásico as manager beating Real Madrid 0–4 in La Liga at the Santiago Bernabéu ending their five-match Clásico losing streak and extending their unbeaten run to 12 matches. On April 14, Xavi and his men who were on the verge of a monumental comeback, were knocked out of the UEL quarter-finals by Eintracht Frankfurt, bringing their fifteen-game unbeaten run to an end. In La Liga, he led Barcelona to a second-placed finish from ninth position when he took charge.

In the 2022–23 UEFA Champions League, Barcelona finished third in their group behind Bayern Munich and Inter Milan to drop to the Europa League for the second consecutive season. On 15 January 2023, Barcelona won their first title under Xavi, following a 3–1 victory against Real Madrid in the Supercopa de España Final.

Style of play

Xavi is widely considered one of the best midfielders of all time, relying largely on his ability to find and exploit space as a deep-lying playmaker. As he said, "That's what I do: look for spaces. All day. I'm always looking." Finding space, he would appear for a teammate to receive and then move the ball on, with his coach Pep Guardiola putting it: "I get the ball, I give the ball, I get the ball, I give the ball." A diminutive, composed, agile, and technically skilled player with a slender physique and a low centre of gravity, these characteristics compensated for his lack of pace or physicality. Xavi's signature move when in possession involved him performing a 360 degree turn, a feint known as la pelopina, that allowed him to move away from the opposing player, retain possession, and gave him space and time on the ball to think about his next pass. In his youth, he had also played as a centre-back, before being shifted to a midfield role. While primarily a central midfielder with Barcelona, he often played in a more advanced midfield role with Spain.

 
Although he was not known for his tackling ability, or for being prolific in front of goal, Xavi's outstanding vision, "metronomic" pinpoint accurate passing, excellent off the ball movement, superb reading of the game, positional sense, and world-class ball control allowed him to create chances for teammates and dictate the flow of play in midfield, while rarely relinquishing possession. These qualities were displayed by his performance during Spain's 2010 World Cup victory, where he maintained a 91% passing success rate throughout the entire tournament, in addition to providing two assists, while Spain dominated possession throughout the competition.

Xavi's ability to control games earned him the sobriquet, The Puppet Master. Jorge Valdano opined, "If football was a science, Xavi would have discovered the formula. With a ball at his feet, no one else has ever communicated so intelligently with every player on the pitch." Barcelona president Sandro Rosell believed that Xavi, together with Lionel Messi, Andrés Iniesta and Sergio Busquets, perfected the club's tiki-taka style of play, a style introduced to the club by former coach Johan Cruyff. Despite primarily being a creative player, however, he was also capable of scoring goals himself in addition to assisting them. Named in the Ballon d'Or Dream Team, a greatest all-time XI, Xavi's creativity, range of passing, and unique set of skills have led many in the sport to regard him as one of the greatest passers and one of the finest playmakers in history. In addition to his playing ability, Xavi was also praised for his leadership.

Media
Xavi has a sponsorship deal with German sportswear and equipment supplier Adidas and has appeared in Adidas commercials alongside Lionel Messi, Luis Suárez and Robin van Persie. Xavi has worn Adidas Predator boots.

In November 2014, Xavi appeared in FIFA's "11 against Ebola" campaign with a selection of top football players from around the world, including Cristiano Ronaldo, Neymar, Gareth Bale and Didier Drogba. Under the slogan "Together, we can beat Ebola", FIFA's campaign was done in conjunction with the Confederation of African Football (CAF) and health experts, with the players holding up 11 messages to raise awareness of the disease and ways to combat it."Neymar, Piqué and Xavi in FIFA campaign against Ebola". FCBarcelona.com. Retrieved 4 March 2015

Personal life
Since July 2013, Xavi has been married to Nuria Cunillera. They have a daughter, Asia, born in 2016 and a son, Dan, born in 2018.

Career statistics
Club

International

Scores and results list Spain's goal tally first, score column indicates score after each Xavi goal.

Managerial statistics

Honours
PlayerBarcelonaLa Liga: 1998–99, 2004–05, 2005–06, 2008–09, 2009–10, 2010–11, 2012–13, 2014–15
Copa del Rey: 2008–09, 2011–12, 2014–15
Supercopa de España: 2005, 2006, 2009, 2010, 2011, 2013
UEFA Champions League: 2005–06, 2008–09, 2010–11, 2014–15
UEFA Super Cup: 2009, 2011
FIFA Club World Cup: 2009, 2011Al SaddQatar Stars League: 2018–19
Qatar Cup: 2017
Sheikh Jassim Cup: 2017
Emir of Qatar Cup: 2017Spain U20FIFA World Youth Championship: 1999SpainFIFA World Cup: 2010
UEFA European Championship: 2008, 2012

Individual
 World Soccer Player of the Year: 2010
 UEFA European Championship Player of the Tournament: 2008
 UEFA Club Midfielder of the Year: 2008–09
 IFFHS World's Best Playmaker: 2008, 2009, 2010, 2011
 La Liga Breakthrough Player of the Year: 1999
 La Liga Spanish Player of the Year: 2005
 La Liga Midfielder of the Year: 2009, 2010, 2011
 FIFA World Cup Dream Team: 2010
 UEFA European Championship Team of the Tournament: 2008, 2012
All-time UEFA European Under-21 Championship dream team: 2015
New York City FC's Ride of Fame: September 2015
 FIFA FIFPro World11: 2008, 2009, 2010, 2011, 2012, 2013
 UEFA Team of the Year: 2008, 2009, 2010, 2011, 2012
 ESM Team of the Year: 2008–09, 2010–11, 2011–12
 Don Balón Team of the Decade: 2010
 FIFA Club World Cup Silver Ball: 2011
 FIFA Club World Cup Bronze Ball: 2009
 Globe Soccer Awards Player Career Award: 2013
 UEFA Ultimate Team of the Year (published 2015)
 Marca Legend Award: 2015
 AFC Champions League Fans' Best XI: 2018
 AFC Champions League OPTA Best XI: 2018
 Ballon d'Or Dream Team: 2020
 IFFHS All-time Men's Dream Team: 2021

Decorations
Spanish Sportsman of the Year: 2009
Gold Medal of the Royal Order of Sporting Merit: 2010
Prince of Asturias Award for Sports: 2010 , 2012 

ManagerAl SaddQatar Stars League: 2020–21
Qatar Cup: 2020, 2021
Sheikh Jassim Cup: 2019
Emir of Qatar Cup: 2020, 2021
Qatari Stars Cup: 2019–20Barcelona'''
Supercopa de España: 2022–23

Notes
 Members of the Spain national football team who won the 2010 FIFA World Cup were jointly awarded 
 Jointly awarded with Iker Casillas''

See also 
 List of footballers with 100 or more UEFA Champions League appearances
 List of men's footballers with 100 or more international caps
 List of men's footballers with the most official appearances

References

External links

 Profile at the FC Barcelona website
 
 National team data at BDFutbol
 
 
 
 

1980 births
Living people
Footballers from Terrassa
Spanish footballers
Association football midfielders
FC Barcelona Atlètic players
FC Barcelona players
Al Sadd SC players
Segunda División B players
Segunda División players
La Liga players
Qatar Stars League players
UEFA Champions League winning players
Olympic footballers of Spain
Spain youth international footballers
Spain under-21 international footballers
Spain under-23 international footballers
Spain international footballers
Catalonia international footballers
Footballers at the 2000 Summer Olympics
2002 FIFA World Cup players
UEFA Euro 2004 players
2006 FIFA World Cup players
UEFA Euro 2008 players
2009 FIFA Confederations Cup players
2010 FIFA World Cup players
UEFA Euro 2012 players
2013 FIFA Confederations Cup players
2014 FIFA World Cup players
Olympic silver medalists for Spain
Olympic medalists in football
Medalists at the 2000 Summer Olympics
UEFA European Championship-winning players
FIFA World Cup-winning players
FIFA Century Club
Spanish expatriate footballers
Expatriate footballers in Qatar
Spanish expatriate sportspeople in Qatar
Spanish football managers
Al Sadd SC managers
FC Barcelona managers
Qatar Stars League managers
La Liga managers
Spanish expatriate football managers
Expatriate football managers in Qatar